Wan Fan (born July 1963) is a Chinese scholar and who is an expert on US studies, and currently president of China Foreign Affairs University.

Biography
Wang was born in Shenyang, Liaoning, in July 1963. He graduated from the Department of Information Management, Peking University in 1986. After completing his master's degree in law from the University of International Relations in 1992, he attended China Foreign Affairs University where he obtained his doctor's degree in law in 2002. He carried out postdoctoral research at Capital Normal University in 2003. From 2003 to 2004, he was a visiting scholar at Long Island University. 

Wang joined the faculty of China Foreign Affairs University in 1992. In 1995, he became a diplomat of the Embassy of China, London, and stepped down in 1997. In September 2006, he served as director of the Institute of International Relations and director of the Center for International Security Studies, and was promoted to full professor in 2007. In April 2015, he was recruited as a part-time professor at the School of Politics and International Relations, Tongji University. In September 2022, he was appointed president of China Foreign Affairs University, a position at vice-ministerial level.

Publications

References

1963 births
Living people
People from Shenyang
Peking University alumni
University of International Relations alumni
China Foreign Affairs University alumni
Presidents of China Foreign Affairs University
Academic staff of Tongji University
Diplomats of the People's Republic of China
21st-century Chinese educators